The 2021–22 NCAA Division I men's basketball season began on November 9, 2021 and concluded on March 13, 2022. The 2022 NCAA Division I men's basketball tournament culminated the season and began on March 15 and concluded on April 4 with the championship game at the Caesars Superdome in New Orleans, Louisiana.

Rule changes
The following rule changes have been recommended by the NCAA Basketball Rules Committee to the Playing Rules Oversight Panel for the 2021–22 season:

Flopping can result in a technical foul.
Increase to six personal fouls before disqualification, with a maximum of four fouls allowed per half (experimental in NIT for 2022).  If a player commits four personal fouls in a single half they will be disqualified for the remainder of the game.
Allowance at the league level for coaches to use technology, live statistics and video on the bench.
Team timeouts can serve as/replace media timeouts (e.g., team calls timeout at the 18-minute mark in a half, that would be used as the under-16-minute media timeout).
Shot clocks will now be able to display tenths of a second, similar to the NBA.

Season headlines
Two of the most significant developments impacting the 2021–22 season took place before the end of the 2020–21 school year, with one occurring before the start of the 2020–21 basketball season.
 On October 14, 2020, the NCAA announced that all student-athletes in winter sports during the 2020–21 school year, including men's and women's basketball, would receive an extra year of athletic eligibility.
 On April 15, 2021, the NCAA Division I Council adopted legislation that extended the so-called "one-time transfer exception" to all D-I sports, with the Division I Board of Directors ratifying this on April 28. This allows student-athletes in baseball, men's and women's basketball, football, and men's ice hockey to transfer one time without having to sit out a year, placing them under the same transfer regulations that previously applied to all other D-I sports.

Other news:
 May 6 – The University of Hartford's governing board voted to begin the process of transitioning the school's athletic program from Division I to NCAA Division III. The plan calls for the following steps:
 January 2022: Formal request for reclassification with the NCAA.
 2022–23: No athletic scholarships will be awarded to incoming students.
 2023–24: Become a provisional member in a D-III conference to be determined; transition remaining students off athletic scholarships by the end of that school year.
 2024–25: Become a full member of the aforementioned D-III conference.
 2025–26: Full D-III membership.
 May 18 – The office of the U.S. Attorney for the Western District of Kentucky released an indictment of former Louisville assistant Dino Gaudio for attempted extortion. The indictment accused Gaudio, whose contract with Louisville was not renewed after the 2020–21 season, of threatening to report NCAA rules violations in the Louisville program to media unless he received an additional 17 months of salary. Gaudio would plead guilty on June 4 and was sentenced to a year of probation and a $10,000 fine on August 27.  In fallout from the case, Louisville suspended head coach Chris Mack without pay for the first 6 games of the 2021–22 season. The university concluded that he failed to follow its guidelines and procedures in relation to the incident.
 July 30 – Oklahoma and Texas formally accepted invitations to join the Southeastern Conference following the 2024–25 season.
 September 3 – Multiple media outlets reported that the Big 12 was on the verge of inviting four schools—American Athletic Conference members Cincinnati, Houston, and UCF, plus BYU, a West Coast Conference member and an FBS independent in football. All four schools were reportedly preparing membership applications, and their future entrance could be approved as early as the next scheduled meeting of Big 12 presidents on September 10. The entry timeline was uncertain at the time of the report, but would most likely be in 2024, and on September 10 the four schools were officially announced as incoming Big 12 members no later than 2024–25.
 October 21 – Six Conference USA members were announced as incoming members of The American Athletic Conference at a future date – Charlotte, Florida Atlantic, North Texas, Rice, UAB, and UTSA.
 October 22 – The Action Network reported that C-USA member Southern Miss had accepted an invitation to join the Sun Belt Conference in 2023, though no formal announcement had then been made. The report added that the Sun Belt was preparing to add two other C-USA members, Marshall and Old Dominion, as well as Colonial Athletic Association member James Madison. At the time, some formal announcements of new members were expected on October 25, but a Marshall announcement was likely to wait until after announcing its new president on October 28. The report also indicated that the Sun Belt would expel its two full non-football members, Little Rock and UT Arlington, after the 2022–23 season.
 October 25 – The Associated Press preseason All-American team was released. Gonzaga forward Drew Timme was the lone unanimous selection (63 votes). Joining him on the team were Illinois center Kofi Cockburn, UCLA guard Johnny Juzang, Villanova guard Collin Gillespie, and Indiana forward Trayce Jackson-Davis. 
 October 26 – Southern Miss was officially announced as a Sun Belt member, effective no later than July 2023. In other Sun Belt realignment news, it was reported that Old Dominion's arrival would be announced later that week, and that James Madison's board had scheduled an emergency meeting on October 29 (presumably to discuss a Sun Belt invitation).
 October 27 – Old Dominion was officially announced as a Sun Belt member, also effective no later than July 2023. This marked ODU's return to that conference after an absence of more than 30 years.
 October 30 – The day after both the Sun Belt Conference and Marshall issued tweets indicating that the Thundering Herd had accepted a Sun Belt invitation, this move was officially announced.
 November 5 – Conference USA, which had nine of its schools depart to other conferences, announced that ASUN Conference members Jacksonville State and Liberty and Western Athletic Conference members New Mexico State and Sam Houston would join C-USA no later than July 2023.
 November 6 – James Madison made its move to the Sun Belt official, initially effective no later than July 2023.
 November 12
 The WAC announced that Incarnate Word would join from the Southland Conference in July 2022.
 Utah governor Spencer Cox signed a bill passed by the Utah State Legislature that changed the name of Dixie State University to Utah Tech University, effective in the 2022–23 school year. The nickname of Trailblazers will not be affected.
 November 16
 The Atlantic 10 Conference announced that Loyola Chicago would join from the Missouri Valley Conference after the 2021–22 season.
 CBS Sports reported that the MVC had entered into talks with three schools regarding future membership—Summit League member Kansas City, Ohio Valley Conference member Murray State, and non-football Sun Belt member UT Arlington. The report indicated that the latter two schools were seen as the strongest candidates, but all three were likely to receive invitations in the coming months.
 December 9 – The other Sun Belt member without a football program, Little Rock, announced that it would join the Ohio Valley Conference on July 1, 2022.
 January 7 – Murray State was announced as a new member of the MVC, effective July 1.
 January 21 – UT Arlington announced it would return to the WAC, in which it had been a member in the 2012–13 school year, effective July 1.
 January 25 – The Colonial Athletic Association announced that it would add three members effective that July—Big South Conference member Hampton, Metro Atlantic Athletic Conference member Monmouth, and Stony Brook, already a CAA football member and otherwise in the America East Conference.
 January 26 – UIC was announced as a new member of the MVC, effective July 1.
 February 2 – The Sun Belt and James Madison both reported the latter's admission to the conference is on July 1, rather than 2023.
 February 7 – The University of Southern Indiana, currently a member of the Division II Great Lakes Valley Conference, announced that it would begin a transition to Division I in 2022–23, with a D-I conference affiliation to be announced in the coming days. A committee report issued in January indicated three leagues believed to be the ASUN Conference, Horizon League, and Ohio Valley Conference were possible landing spots.
 February 9 – Southern Indiana was announced as a new member of the OVC, effective July 1.
 February 11 – Marshall, Old Dominion, and Southern Miss, which were initially announced as moving from C-USA to the Sun Belt no later than 2023, jointly announced that they intended to leave C-USA in July 2022. All three schools claimed that in December 2021, they had notified C-USA of their intent to leave C-USA after the 2021–22 school year, but that C-USA did not attempt to negotiate a resolution to this issue. C-USA had stated in late January that it expected the three departing schools to remain in the conference through 2022–23.
 February 20 – Michigan head coach Juwan Howard, upset with a time-out called by Wisconsin head coach Greg Gard as Wisconsin was leading by an insurmountable margin with about 30 seconds remaining, took a swing at a Wisconsin assistant coach in the handshake line after the game ended. It resulted in a brawl in which police officers had to separate players and coaches from both teams. The next day, Howard was suspended for the final five games of Michigan's regular season, with associate head coach Phil Martelli serving as interim head coach during Howard's suspension. Michigan players Moussa Diabaté and Terrance Williams II, as well as Wisconsin player Jahcobi Neath, all also received one-game suspensions for their roles in the brawl.
 February 22 – The Colonial Athletic Association announced that North Carolina A&T would join from the Big South Conference on July 1. (The football team will join the CAA football league, legally a separate entity, in 2023.)
 February 23
 Marshall filed suit in its local court against C-USA in an attempt to make its planned move to the Sun Belt Conference in July 2022.
 The OVC announced the July 2022 entry of another Division II upgrader, Lindenwood.
 March 1 – While not directly related to basketball, the Sun Belt Conference's release of its 2022 football schedule notably included all three schools set to move from C-USA (Marshall, Old Dominion, Southern Miss). The SBC release did not mention the ongoing dispute between C-USA and the three schools, or the prospect of those schools being unable to join for the 2022–23 school year.
 March 5 – Duke head coach Mike Krzyzewski coached his final home game at Cameron Indoor Stadium, the culmination of a 42-year career at the school. Over 90 former Duke players attended the game in a 94–81 loss to rival North Carolina. The average sold ticket price to attend the game was over $6,000 – more than the average price for a Super Bowl LVI ticket.
 March 29
 Conference USA, Marshall, Old Dominion, and Southern Miss issued a joint statement that all parties had reached a settlement that will allow the three schools to join the Sun Belt Conference in July 2022.
 The America East Conference announced that Bryant would join from the Northeast Conference on July 1, 2022.
 April 5 – The Northeast Conference announced the addition of current Division II member Stonehill, effective July 1, 2022.
 May 2 – Mount St. Mary's announced they would join the Metro Atlantic beginning July 1, 2022.
 May 6 – Queens University of Charlotte, a member of the Division II South Atlantic Conference, announced they would be joining the ASUN on July 1, 2022.

Milestones and records
During the season, the following players reached the 2,000 career point milestone – UConn guard R. J. Cole, Richmond forward Grant Golden, Hofstra guard Zach Cooks, Appalachian State guard Justin Forrest, Arizona State guard Marreon Jackson, Stony Brook guard Jahlil Jenkins, Washington State guard Michael Flowers, Texas Tech forward Bryson Williams, UAB guard Michael Ertel, Weber State guard Koby McEwen, Maryland guard Fatts Russell, Loyola Marymount swingman Eli Scott, Iowa guard Jordan Bohannon, Richmond guard Jacob Gilyard, North Carolina forward Brady Manek, and Kansas guard Remy Martin.
Additionally, Golden collected his 1,000th rebound in Richmond's Atlantic 10 tournament semifinal win over Dayton, becoming the first player to hit the career 2,000 point, 1,000 rebound mark in the season.
November 18 — Iowa guard Jordan Bohannon set the Big Ten record for career three-point field goals when he hit his 375th in a game against Alabama State. Bohannon passed Ohio State's Jon Diebler.
December 4 — Alabama became the first program ever to defeat top 5 teams in both football and basketball on the same day. The Crimson Tide football team defeated top-ranked Georgia in the 2021 SEC Championship Game 41–24 and then later the basketball team beat third-ranked Gonzaga 91–82 in Seattle.
December 5 – Richmond guard Jacob Gilyard set the new all-time NCAA Division I career steals record, securing his 386th steal to surpass Providence's John Linehan (385), whose record had stood since 2002.
On December 22, he became the first Division I player to reach 400 steals in a win over Bucknell.
 December 6 – Purdue ascended to the No. 1 national ranking in the AP Poll for the first time in program history.
 January 6 – In Iowa's 87–78 loss at Wisconsin, Jordan Bohannon appeared in his 158th career game, surpassing the all-time Division I men's record previously held by Ohio State's David Lighty from 2006 to 2011.
 January 15 – Liberty's Darius McGhee scored a school-record 48 points, including 37 in the second half, in a 78–75 win against Florida Gulf Coast.
 January 24 – Auburn climbed to No. 1 in the AP Poll for the first time in program history.
 February 5–16 – With wins over Michigan State, Ohio State, Wisconsin, and Illinois, Rutgers became the first unranked team in D-I men's history to defeat ranked teams in four consecutive regular-season games.
 February 26 – All of the top six teams in the AP Poll (Gonzaga, Arizona, Auburn, Purdue, Kansas, and Kentucky) lost, as well as No. 9 Texas Tech. This broke the previous record of six AP top-10 teams losing on the same day, and was also the first time in the history of the AP Poll that the top six teams lost on the same day.
 March 8 – Bellarmine won the ASUN tournament, defeating Jacksonville 77–72. The Knights, in their second year of a four-year transition from Division II, will be ineligible for the NCAA tournament or NIT until the 2024–25 season; under ASUN rules, the conference's automatic bid went to Jacksonville State, which had the best regular-season conference record. Bellarmine became the first D-I men's team in at least the last 25 years to win its conference tournament while being ineligible for the NCAA tournament.

Conference membership changes
Eleven schools joined new conferences, including a school transitioning from Division III.

The 2021–22 season was the last for 21 Division I schools in their then-current conferences. Five NCAA Division II schools started transitions to D-I after the season.
 Austin Peay moved from the Ohio Valley Conference (OVC) and Queens (NC) also moved from the South Atlantic Conference (D-II) to the ASUN Conference (ASUN).
 Belmont and Murray State, both OVC members, and UIC of the Horizon League left for the Missouri Valley Conference (MVC). 
 Bryant left the Northeast Conference (NEC) for the America East.
 Chicago State left the Western Athletic Conference (WAC), becoming an independent for the time being.
 Hampton, Monmouth, North Carolina A&T, and Stony Brook left their respective conferences (Hampton, NCAT: Big South; Monmouth: MAAC; Stony Brook: America East) for the Colonial Athletic Association.
 Hartford left the America East as part of its ongoing transition to Division III, becoming an independent for 2022–23. It eventually found a D-III home in the Commonwealth Coast Conference, which it joins in July 2023.
 Four schools joined the Sun Belt Conference (SBC)—James Madison from the CAA, and Marshall, Old Dominion, and Southern Miss from Conference USA.
 Lamar, which had previously announced that it would leave the WAC in 2023 to return to the Southland Conference, accelerated this move to 2022–23.
 Lindenwood, Little Rock, and Southern Indiana left their respective conferences (Lindenwood, Southern Indiana: D-II Great Lakes Valley Conference; Little Rock: SBC) for the OVC.
 Loyola Chicago left the MVC for the Atlantic 10 Conference. 
 Mount St. Mary's left the NEC for the Metro Atlantic Athletic Conference (MAAC).
 Southern Utah and UT Arlington respectively left the Big Sky Conference and SBC for the WAC. Incarnate Word had announced a move to the WAC, but backed out of that plan and remained in the Southland.
 Stonehill left the D-II Northeast-10 Conference (NE-10) for the NEC.
 Texas A&M–Commerce left the D-II Lone Star Conference for the Southland Conference.

Arenas

New arenas
 This was the first season for High Point at the 4,500-seat Qubein Center (full name: Nido and Mariana Qubein Arena and Conference Center). The new arena was originally intended to open for the 2020–21 season, but was delayed due to COVID-19 issues. The facility officially opened on the weekend of September 24–26; the first sports event was a men's basketball exhibition against Division II Mount Olive on November 4, 2021. The regular-season opener was a men's and women's doubleheader against nearby Elon on November 9.
 This was the first season for Idaho at the new 4,200-seat Idaho Central Credit Union Arena. The first event in the new arena was an exhibition against NAIA Evergreen State on October 29. The first regular-season game was the season opener against Long Beach State on November 10, 2021, won by The Beach 95–89 in overtime. The game served as a homecoming for The Beach's head coach Dan Monson, who played football at Idaho before an injury ended his playing career and is the son of Vandals coaching legend Don Monson.

Arenas of new D-I teams
 St. Thomas plays at its existing on-campus facility, Schoenecker Arena (capacity 1,800).

Arenas closing
The following D-I programs planned to open new arenas for the 2022–23 season. All will move within their current campuses unless otherwise indicated.
 Alabama A&M will leave Elmore Gymnasium for the new Alabama A&M Events Center; the venue is scheduled to open in July 2022.
 Austin Peay planned to leave the on-campus Winfield Dunn Center for the new F&M Bank Arena in downtown Clarksville, Tennessee. However, construction delays led to this move being put off until 2023–24.
 Georgia State will leave GSU Sports Arena for a facility tentatively named Georgia State Convocation Center.
 Texas will leave the Frank Erwin Center, which will be demolished to accommodate an expansion of the university's medical school, for the Moody Center.
 Vermont will leave Patrick Gymnasium for the Tarrant Event Center.

Season outlook

The top 25 from the AP and USA Today Coaches Polls.

Pre-season polls

Final polls

Regular season top 10 matchups
Rankings reflect the AP poll Top 25.

November 9
No. 9 Duke defeated No. 10 Kentucky, 79–71 (Champions Classic, Madison Square Garden, New York, NY)
November 12 
No. 2 UCLA defeated No. 4 Villanova, 86–77OT (Pauley Pavilion, Los Angeles, CA)
November 13
No. 1 Gonzaga defeated No. 5 Texas, 86–74 (McCarthey Athletic Center Spokane, WA)
November 21
No. 6 Purdue defeated No. 5 Villanova, 80–74 (Hall of Fame Tip Off, Mohegan Sun Arena, Uncasville, CT)
November 23
No. 1 Gonzaga defeated No. 2 UCLA, 83–63 (Empire Classic, T-Mobile Arena, Las Vegas, NV)
November 26
No. 5 Duke defeated No. 1 Gonzaga, 84–81 (Continental Tire Challenge, T-Mobile Arena, Las Vegas, NV)
December 12
No. 2 Baylor defeated No. 6 Villanova, 57–36 (Ferrell Center, Waco, TX)
January 1
No. 1 Baylor defeated No. 8 Iowa State, 77–72 (Hilton Coliseum, Ames, IA)
January 25
No. 7 UCLA defeated No. 3 Arizona, 75–59 (Pauley Pavilion, Los Angeles, CA)
February 3
No. 7 Arizona defeated No. 3 UCLA, 76–66 (McKale Center, Tucson, AZ)
February 5
No. 10 Kansas defeated No. 8 Baylor, 83–59 (Allen Fieldhouse, Lawrence, KS)
February 15
No. 10 Villanova defeated No. 8 Providence, 89–84 (Dunkin' Donuts Center, Providence, RI)
February 26
No. 10 Baylor defeated No. 5 Kansas, 80–70 (Ferrell Center, Waco, TX)
March 1
No. 10 Wisconsin defeated No. 8 Purdue, 70–67 (Kohl Center, Madison, Wisconsin)
March 12
No. 9 Tennessee defeated No. 5 Kentucky, 69–62 (2022 SEC men's basketball tournament, Amalie Arena, Tampa, Florida)

Regular season

Early season tournaments

Upsets
An upset is a victory by an underdog team. In the context of NCAA Division I men's basketball, this generally constitutes an unranked team defeating a team currently ranked in the top 25. This list will highlight those upsets of ranked teams by unranked teams as well as upsets of No. 1 teams. Rankings are from the AP poll. Bold type indicates winning teams in "true road games"—i.e., those played on an opponent's home court (including secondary homes).

In addition to the above listed upsets in which an unranked team defeated a ranked team, there were eight non-Division I teams to defeat a Division I team this season. Bold type indicates winning teams in "true road games"—i.e., those played on an opponent's home court (including secondary homes).

Conference winners and tournaments
Each of the 32 Division I athletic conferences ended its regular season with a single-elimination tournament. The team with the best regular-season record in each conference received the number one seed in each tournament, with tiebreakers used as needed in the case of ties for the top seeding. Unless otherwise noted, the winners of these tournaments received automatic invitations to the 2022 NCAA Division I men's basketball tournament.

Statistical leaders

Conference standings

Postseason

Tournament upsets
For this list, an "upset" is defined as a win by a team seeded 5 or more spots below its defeated opponent.

Award winners

2022 Consensus All-Americans

Major player of the year awards
Wooden Award: Oscar Tshiebwe, Kentucky
Naismith Award: Oscar Tshiebwe, Kentucky
Associated Press Player of the Year: Oscar Tshiebwe, Kentucky
NABC Player of the Year: Oscar Tshiebwe, Kentucky
Oscar Robertson Trophy (USBWA): Oscar Tshiebwe, Kentucky
Sporting News Player of the Year: Oscar Tshiebwe, Kentucky

Major freshman of the year awards
Wayman Tisdale Award (USBWA): Jabari Smith, Auburn
 NABC Freshman of the Year: Jabari Smith, Auburn

Major coach of the year awards
Associated Press Coach of the Year: Tommy Lloyd, Arizona
Henry Iba Award (USBWA): Tommy Lloyd, Arizona
NABC Coach of the Year: Tommy Lloyd, Arizona
Naismith College Coach of the Year: Ed Cooley, Providence
 Sporting News Coach of the Year: Ed Cooley, Providence

Other major awards
 Naismith Starting Five:
 Bob Cousy Award (best point guard): Collin Gillespie, Villanova
 Jerry West Award (best shooting guard): Johnny Davis, Wisconsin
 Julius Erving Award (best small forward): Wendell Moore Jr., Duke
 Karl Malone Award (best power forward): Keegan Murray, Iowa
 Kareem Abdul-Jabbar Award (best center): Oscar Tshiebwe, Kentucky
 Pete Newell Big Man Award (best big man): Oscar Tshiebwe, Kentucky
 NABC Defensive Player of the Year: Walker Kessler, Auburn
 Naismith Defensive Player of the Year: Walker Kessler, Auburn
Lute Olson Award: Johnny Davis, Wisconsin
Senior CLASS Award (top senior on and off the court): Jacob Gilyard, Richmond
Robert V. Geasey Trophy (top player in Philadelphia Big 5): Collin Gillespie, Villanova
Haggerty Award (top player in NYC metro area): Ron Harper Jr., Rutgers
Ben Jobe Award (top minority coach): Kelvin Sampson, Houston
Hugh Durham Award (top mid-major coach): Robert Jones, Norfolk State
Jim Phelan Award (top head coach): Mark Adams, Texas Tech
Lefty Driesell Award (top defensive player): KC Ndefo, Saint Peter's
Lou Henson Award (top mid-major player): Malachi Smith, Chattanooga
Skip Prosser Man of the Year Award (coach with moral character): Jay McAuley, Wofford
Academic All-American of the Year (top scholar-athlete): Ben Vander Plas, Ohio
 Elite 90 Award (top GPA among upperclass players at Final Four): Michael Savarino, Duke
 Perry Wallace Most Courageous Award: Andrew Jones, Texas (shared with Justin Hardy of Division III Washington (MO))

Coaching changes
Many teams will change coaches during the season and after it ends.

See also
2021–22 NCAA Division I women's basketball season

References